BTG Limited is an international specialist healthcare company that is developing and commercialising products targeting critical care, cancer and other disorders. The current name was adopted when the British Technology Group changed its name on 27 May 1998. BTG was a constituent of the FTSE 250 Index until it was acquired by Boston Scientific in August 2019.

History
In 1948, the National Research Development Corporation was formed with the purpose of commercialising innovations that arose from public funded research. This was complemented in November 1975 by the establishment of the National Enterprise Board to implement the then-Government's policy of moving public sector industry into commercial private enterprise.

These two organisations were merged by the Government in 1981 to form a new, non-statutory body called the British Technology Group. It acted principally to license and commercialise the use of publicly funded developments. The Group was put onto a statutory footing in the British Technology Group Act 1991 with HM Treasury initially being the only shareholder. Subsequently, in March 1992, Cinven arranged a management buy-out from the Government. The company later floated on the London Stock Exchange in 1995. Three years later, on 27 May 1998, the Group adopted its present name. It now focuses its work on developing and commercialising medical innovations.

Since acquiring the commercialisation rights to magnetic resonance imaging (MRI) (under a revenue share scheme) in 1983, BTG has come to license a large part of the world market in MRI, including licensees such as General Electric and Philips.

BTG plc completed the acquisition of Protherics PLC in December 2008 and of Biocompatibles International plc in January 2011. In May 2016 BTG plc acquired the Israeli company Galil Medical for US$110 million. In September 2018, BTG plc acquired Novate Medical for up to $150 million.

In late November 2018 Boston Scientific announced it would acquire BTG for $4.2 billion. The transaction was due to complete in August 2019.

Operations
BTG earns revenues from specialty pharmaceutical and interventional medicine product sales and on royalties from partnered products. It trades as BTG International Inc. in the United States and as BTG International Ltd. in the United Kingdom.

See also
Medical research
National Enterprise Board
National Research Development Corporation

References

External links
BTG plc's website

Health care companies of the United Kingdom
Health care companies established in 1991
Companies based in the City of London
British companies established in 1991
Companies listed on the London Stock Exchange
Research and development in the United Kingdom
1991 establishments in England
2019 mergers and acquisitions
Health care companies disestablished in 2019
2019 disestablishments in England